The Sony Cyber-shot DSC-HX90V is a digital zoom compact camera, which can zoom up to 30x; equivalent to 24-720mm. At the time of its release, it is the world's smallest superzoom camera (along with its sibling, the WX500). It features optical image stabilization, an AF Illuminator, an 18.2MP BSI Active pixel sensor and has customisable settings. The camera has a pop-up OLED electronic viewfinder that has 638,400 dots and is far brighter than any other conventional electronic viewfinders. The camera’s screen is a 3" TFT LCD (921,000 dots) that tilts upward 180 degrees. Also borrowed from the RX100 is a customizable ring around the front of the lens. The HX90V can record video at 1080/60p using the XAVC S codec, which allows for bit rates up to 50MBps. The camera has a built-in GPS; used for geotagging. The camera also has built-in Wi-Fi with NFC and Bluetooth, which means you can connect your camera to your phone or tablet by using PlayMemories Camera Apps.

Structure 

Body

It has a smooth, plastic, rigid body that covers the interior. (inside)

Grip

Its grip is a bump on the front of the camera made out of rubber to grip onto.

Lenses

Made out of ZEISS glass to make an image look professional with no enhancement.

History 

 June 2015: Was first built and became the world's smallest superzoom camera.
 2018: Lost its 1st place due to the most recent small superzoom camera called "DSC-HX99"

References

Information
Specifications 
Manual And Help Guides in PDF for Sony Cyber-shot DSC-HX90V

HX90V
Cameras introduced in 2015